Logan-Rogersville High School (LRHS) is a public high school for grades 9–12 located in Rogersville, Missouri as part of the Logan-Rogersville R-VIII School District. The National Center for Education Statistics classifies LRHS as a "rural fringe" locale, which is defined as a rural area that is less than or equal to 5 miles from an urban area. The mascot of LRHS is the wildcat with the colors of maroon and white.

LRHS was the site for the Guinness World Records largest game of duck, duck, goose with 2,135 participants on October 7, 2011. On May 20, 2022, the record held by the Logan-Rogersville School District was attempted to be broken by a game held by Terre Haute North Vigo High School, Terre Haute South Vigo High School, and West Vigo High School in Terre Haute, Indiana. However, the attempt was unsuccessful, and Guinness World Records still lists the Logan-Rogersville School District as the holder of the record.

School statistics 
The school statistics that follow are comprehensive with available information through 2022. In the most recent year with available data, total enrollment was 752 students with a dropout rate of approximately 3%. The school is predominately white, but the racial diversity has slowly increased over the last fifteen years. The number of economically disadvantaged students (defined as the number of students with a free or reduced lunch) is 17.9%, which is the lowest percentage the high school has seen since 2007. The student-to-teacher ratio is 15:1, which has remained relatively constant over the years. Teachers are paid an average total salary of $55,954, administrators are paid an average total salary of $96,993, and the average amount of experience for teachers is 14.5 years.

The Logan-Rogersville High School statistics shown in the tables below are from the Missouri Department of Elementary and Secondary Education.

Academics 

Under LRHS principal Emmett Sawyer, a learning structure study was conducted for the school between 1988–1990. The results of the 3-year study concluded that 22% of students preferred very little structure while 20% preferred substantial structure, among other findings. Various learning-style strategies were implemented based on the analysis, which resulted in increased academic performance with students.

In 2000, a Missouri State University academic study was conducted on top LRHS graduates from 1992–1999 on analyzing science achievements and attitudes between males and females on pursuing a career in science, technology, engineering, and mathematics. The study found that "there were no significant differences between females and males for ACT and GPA scores" but that "most of the females stated they did not like math and science" while "more males in this study pursued a math and science-related career".

LRHS is one of the few schools in Missouri that offers the Missouri Seal of Biliteracy (SoBL), which is awarded to "graduating high school students in districts with a DESE-approved program, who have demonstrated achievement in English, a Language Other Than English (LOTE), and sociocultural competence".

LRHS began CPR training for students during the 2017–2018 academic year, which was required from Missouri Senate Bill No. 711 from the 98th Missouri General Assembly in 2016.

As of spring 2020, the graduation requirements for LRHS require a total of 26 course credits. Specific subject credit requirements are listed below.

 Language Arts (4.0 Credits)
 Social Studies (3.0 Credits)
 Mathematics (3.0 Credits)
 Science (3.0 Credits)
 Practical Arts (2.0 Credits)
 Physical Education (1.5 Credits)
 Fine Arts (1.0 Credit)
 Health (0.5 Credit)
 Electives (8.0 Credits)

History

Building and projects

The history of the Logan-Rogersville School District has been documented by the Citizen's Bank of Rogersville:

On January 27, 2005, a ribbon-cutting ceremony was held for the new  LRHS building. The new LRHS building was funded from a $14.9 million bond issue that passed on April 2, 2002.

The Class of 2010 started the "Preserving the Past for Future LR Generations" senior class photo composite project, which consists of swinging photo panels in the high school commons area. The system contains over 75 years of composites and photos, the oldest being the Class of 1927.

LRHS was awarded a grant for a tornado safe room on December 9, 2013. The grant was part of the Hazard Mitigation Grant Program (HMGP), which was authorized by the Stafford Disaster Relief and Emergency Assistance Act and provides 75 percent of the activity costs from the federal government with the remaining 25 percent being provided by non-federal sources.

The following is a summary of LRHS projects that have received grant funding from the Logan-Rogersville Educational Foundation (LREF).

 Journalism iMac Computer (June 2011)
 Math SMART Response System (June 2011)
 Chromebooks (February 2014)
 Smart TV (February 2016)
 Speech-Language Pathology Forbrain Devices (February 2016)
 PE Gym Timer (February 2017)
 Special Education Smart TV (February 2018)
 Science Vernier LabQuests, Microscopes, and Mini Torsos (February 2019)
 Choir iPads (February 2019)
 School Counselor Instax Cameras (February 2020)
 School Counselor Culture Creators Project (February 2020)
 Library 3D Printer (February 2020)
 Special Education Dell Tablets and iPads (February 2020)
 Visual Arts HP Laptop, Scanner, and Printer (February 2020)
 Esports Computers and Equipment (March 2022)

Controversies 
In February 2014, a vulgar flier was circulated among LRHS students that described a points contest for the winter homecoming dance for accomplishing various sexual acts including rape. School officials were made aware of the flier prior to the homecoming dance, and three students were placed under investigation.

In October 2017, LRHS was the center of controversy due to the "Rogersville Horror Story" fundraiser for the school's Project Graduation, which was a haunted house event in a local funeral home. Critics argued that the event was "distasteful" and that it was "insensitive to use a place of grief and mourning to make a mockery of death" while supporters argued that the "facility has been closed for a while and is slated for demolition" and that the event was worthwhile with "proceeds going toward a safe celebration for seniors on graduation night".

On February 28, 2018, it was reported that a student was planning on bringing a gun to LRHS. After the student was detained and questioned, the threat was deemed as not credible, but additional security was provided from the Rogersville Police Department at LRHS following the threat.

On May 13, 2019, An LRHS student reportedly warned other students not to come to school the following day on May 14. The threat was reported to law enforcement, and after an investigation throughout the prior night, the student was arrested shortly after midnight. LRHS proceeded with caution in providing an additional police presence on May 14.

In June 2021, a former LRHS student filed a lawsuit against the school district and former track coach for a knee injury suffered during high school track practice on May 29, 2018. The lawsuit claimed that the injury was the result of a "dangerous condition" with a "foreseeable risk of harm" with students performing "toe touches both on and off unsecured metal folding chairs on the concrete gym floor".

Extracurricular activities

Baseball 

The LRHS baseball team has placed a total of four times in the MSHSAA State Championship Tournament. The state championship history is summarized in the table below.

Basketball 

The LRHS boys' basketball team has placed a total of six times in the MSHSAA State Championship Tournament. The LRHS girls' basketball team has placed once in the MSHSAA State Championship Tournament. The state championship history is summarized in the tables below.

Choir 
The LRHS varsity choir performed at Carnegie Hall in 2004, and the choir returned five years later to perform on Memorial Day in 2009 as one of the choruses for Fauré's Requiem in D minor. The LRHS varsity choir performed as the featured choir at Carnegie Hall on March 18, 2018.

Clubs and miscellaneous 

As of 2021, there are 22 active student clubs at LRHS that are listed below.

 Academic bowl
 Archery
 Art Club
 Bass Fishing
 Bowling
 Game Club
 DECA
 FCA
 FCCLA
 FBLA
 FFA
 Future Teachers of America
 GSA
 Key Club
 Lit Club
 Math Club
 National Art Honor Society
 National Honor Society
 Pep Club
 Trap & Skeet
 Student Council
 World Language Club

In 2013, the Supreme Court of Missouri's civic education committee hosted the first statewide Constitution Project, which included competitions in journalism, crime scene investigation, and trial advocacy. LRHS won the Grand Champion Award and the traveling Freedom Cup trophy for the highest overall score. In 2015, LRHS returned to win the Grand Champion Award and Freedom Cup.

Cross country 
The LRHS boys' cross country team has had a total of three runners become individual champions in the MSHSAA State Championship Race, but the team has never placed in the state race. The LRHS girls' cross country team has placed a total of six times in the MSHSAA State Championship Race. The state championship history is summarized in the tables below.

Football 

The LRHS football team won the 2011–2012 MSHSAA Class 3 State Championship, defeating John Burroughs School of St. Louis 21–14.

Head football coach Doug Smith announced his retirement after the 2017–2018 football season. Smith was a coach for 32 years, 11 of which were at LRHS. LRHS announced in March 2018 that Mark Talbert was selected as the new head football coach, who was previously defensive coordinator for Fair Grove High School.

The state championship history is summarized in the table below.

Golf 
The LRHS boys' golf team has placed a total of four times in the MSHSAA State Championship Tournament while the LRHS girls' golf team has placed three times. The state championship history is summarized in the tables below.

Scholar Bowl 
The LRHS scholar bowl team has never placed in the MSHSAA State Championship Tournament. The state championship history is summarized in the table below.

Soccer 
Both the LRHS boys' and girls' soccer teams have never placed in the MSHSAA State Championship Tournament. The state championship history is summarized in the table below.

Softball 
The LRHS softball team has never placed in the MSHSAA State Championship Tournament. The state championship history is summarized in the table below.

Speech and debate 
LRHS has had two policy debate teams win the MSHSAA State Championship Tournament. Numerous teams and individuals have also placed in the National Speech and Debate Association district tournament in various events and have advanced to the National Speech and Debate Tournament. LRHS state championship and national qualification history is summarized in the tables below.

Tennis 
Both the LRHS boys' tennis team and the LRHS girls' tennis team have placed a total of three times in the MSHSAA State Championship Tournament. The state championship history is summarized in the tables below.

Track and field 
The LRHS boys' outdoor track and field team has had a total of three athletes and two relay teams become champions in the MSHSAA State Championship Tournament. The LRHS boys' outdoor track and field team has placed a total of four times in the MSHSAA State Championship Tournament. The state championship history is summarized in the table below.

Volleyball 

The LRHS volleyball team has placed a total of nine times in the MSHSAA State Championship Tournament. The state championship history is summarized in the table below.

Wrestling 
The LRHS wrestling team has placed once in the MSHSAA State Championship Tournament. However, numerous individuals representing LRHS have won championships in the state tournament. The state championship history is summarized in the table below.

Notable alumni

Notable faculty

Notes

References

External links 
 Logan-Rogersville High School Website

Public high schools in Missouri
High schools in Greene County, Missouri